Mariandl is a 1961 Austrian drama film directed by Werner Jacobs and starring Cornelia Froboess, Rudolf Prack and Waltraut Haas. It was followed by a sequel Mariandl's Homecoming in 1962. A girl living in a hotel aspires to a musical scholarship.

The film's sets were designed by the art directors Fritz Jüptner-Jonstorff and Alexander Sawczynski.

Song: "Mariandl"
Part of the film soundtrack is the single "Mariandl" which was composed by Hans Lang. The song had been translated into an English version which was sung by Petula Clark and Jimmy Young.

Cast
 Cornelia Froboess as Mariandl
 Rudolf Prack as Hofrat Franz Geiger
 Waltraut Haas as Marianne Mühlhuber
 Hans Moser as Opa Windischgruber
 Gunther Philipp as Gustl Pfüller
 Peter Weck as Peter Hofer
 Susi Nicoletti as Franzi
 Edith Elmay as Steffi Holler
 Andrea Klass as Liesl
 Elisabeth Stiepl as Theres, Kellnerin
 Hugo Gottschlich as Ferdl, Dienstmann

See also
Der Hofrat Geiger (1947)

References

External links
 

1961 films
Austrian musical drama films
1960s German-language films
Films directed by Werner Jacobs
Remakes of Austrian films
Sascha-Film films
Constantin Film films
Films scored by Hans Lang
1960s musical drama films
1961 drama films